Acrocercops chrysophila is a moth of the family Gracillariidae, known to be from Uttarakhand, India. It was described by E. Meyrick in 1937. The hostplants for the species include Eugenia cumini and Eugenia jambolana.

References

chrysophila
Moths of Asia
Moths described in 1937